"Lost Without Each Other" is a song written and performed by American pop-rock band Hanson. It was released as the second single from the band's third studio album, Underneath (2004), on August 9, 2004. The song peaked at number 39 on the UK Singles Chart but failed to obtain any significant success elsewhere.

Track listings
All songs were written by Isaac Hanson, Taylor Hanson, and Zac Hanson. Additional writers in parentheses.

UK CD1
 "Lost Without Each Other" (album version) 
 "Strong Enough to Break" (live) 

UK CD2
 "Lost Without Each Other" (album version) 
 "Crazy Beautiful" (live)
 "Misery" (live)
 "Lost Without Each Other" (video)

Australian and New Zealand CD single
 "Lost Without Each Other" (album version)  – 3:44
 "Strong Enough to Break" (live)  – 3:32
 "This Time Around" (Underneath acoustic live) – 5:59
 "Lost Without Each Other" (video) – 3:42

Charts

Release history

References

2004 songs
2005 singles
Cooking Vinyl singles
Hanson (band) songs
Songs written by Gregg Alexander
Songs written by Isaac Hanson
Songs written by Taylor Hanson
Songs written by Zac Hanson